Parliamentary elections were scheduled to be held in Ciskei in November 1986. However, the 23 candidates of the Ciskei National Independence Party were the only ones to register, and were deemed to be elected unopposed in September 1986.

References

Ciskei
Elections in Ciskei
Uncontested elections
September 1986 events in Africa